Alvaston is an electoral ward in the city of Derby, England.  The ward contains 14 listed buildings that are recorded in the National Heritage List for England.  Of these, three are listed at Grade II*, the middle of the three grades, and the others are at Grade II, the lowest grade.  The ward was initially a village, and it has grown to become a suburb of the city.  Towards the north of the ward are the former Tri Junct Station and the Derby Railway Works, and associated with them are four listed buildings.  Some of the oldest listed buildings, consisting of cottages and a farmhouse, are located near the original centre of the village.  The other listed buildings include churches and associated structures, a former toll house, and a conference centre.


Key

Buildings

References

Citations

Sources

 

Lists of listed buildings in Derbyshire
Listed buildings in Derby